Erzsi is the short version of Erzsébet, the Hungarian form of the given name Elizabeth.

Notable people with the (nick)name Erzsi include:

Erzsi Ferenczy (c. 1904 – 2000), wife of Hungarian painter Béni Ferenczy
Erzsi Kovács DRH (1928–2014), Hungarian pop singer and performer
Erzsi Pártos (1907–2000), Hungarian film actress
Erzsi Pásztor (born 1936), Hungarian film actress
Erzsi Simor (1913–1977), Hungarian film actress

See also
Elizabeth (disambiguation)
Ersi (disambiguation)
Erzi (disambiguation)